King John's Castle or King's Castle is a tower house and National Monument located in Kilmallock, Ireland.

Location

History

Despite the name, the tower house (or peel tower) was not erected during King John's reign (1177–1216) but some time in the 15th century. The name is probably intended to invite comparison to King John's Castle, Limerick.

There are some original mullioned windows still present but most were replaced with 18th-century windows.

It was granted to Henry Billingsley in 1588, and to Thomas Browne in 1604. In 1645 it was used as an arsenal by James Tuchet, 3rd Earl of Castlehaven's troops during the Irish Confederate Wars, and was a military hospital in 1651.

The tower was renovated in the 18th/19th century and was used as a blacksmith's workshop.

Building

A four-storey tower house with some original mullioned windows. It is vaulted above the ground floor and the front and back walls were removed so that the castle is pierced by a large Gothic arch.

References

National Monuments in County Limerick
Castles in County Limerick
Towers completed in the 15th century
Peel towers
Towers in the Republic of Ireland